Nira Devi Jairu is a Nepali communist politician and a member of the House of Representatives of the federal parliament of Nepal. She was elected under the proportional representation system from CPN UML, filling the reserved seat for women and dalit groups. She currently represents the newly formed Nepal Communist Party (NCP) in parliament, where she also chairs the Parliamentary Committee on Implementation, Monitoring and Evaluation of State's Directive Principles, Policies and Responsibilities. She was also appointed the "Co-Incharge" of Dadeldhura district for NCP.

References

Living people
Place of birth missing (living people)
People from Dadeldhura District
21st-century Nepalese women politicians
21st-century Nepalese politicians
Nepal Communist Party (NCP) politicians
Communist Party of Nepal (Unified Socialist) politicians
Dalit politicians
Nepal MPs 2017–2022
Communist Party of Nepal (Unified Marxist–Leninist) politicians
1977 births